Lučka Coat (born 26 October 1972) is a Slovenian female canoeist who won three medals at individual senior level at the Wildwater Canoeing World Championships and European Wildwater Championships.

References

External links
 Lučka Cankar at Klemen Jakse

1972 births
Living people
Slovenian female canoeists
20th-century Slovenian women
21st-century Slovenian women